Sibernetic is a fluid mechanics simulator developed for simulations of C. elegans in the OpenWorm project developed for the OpenWorm project by Andrey Palyanov, Sergey Khayrulin and Mike Vella as part of the OpenWorm team. Sibernetic provides an implementation of the PCISPH contractile matter algorithm for simulating muscle tissue and is applied to C. elegans locomotion.

External links
  https://github.com/openworm/sibernetic

Programming languages